Sixteen Sunsets is a studio album by American jazz saxophonist Jane Ira Bloom. The album was released on December 15, 2013 by Outline Records label. This is her 15th album as a band leader. Sixteen Sunsets received a Grammy nomination for Best Surround Sound Album in 2014.

Reception
The Buffalo Newss Jeff Simon wrote, "Not only is this one of the best jazz discs of the year, it's, without doubt, one of the most beautiful records soprano saxophonist Jane Ira Bloom has ever made in a recording life that has been replete with the sublime... A magnificent disc—a balladic revelation for the final weeks of the year." Dan McClenaghan of All About Jazz stated, "Sixteen Sunsets is, arguably, Jane Ira Bloom's most compelling recording. It's certainly her loveliest—no argument there. And the sound quality is out of this world. An asteroid is nice, but it seems a rather small celestial body for an artist that can create something as perfect as this disc. Perhaps a star, a bright one, can be found." Lloyd Sachs of JazzTimes added, "Moving seamlessly between standards and originals, Sixteen Sunsets unfolds with a luminous intensity." NPR's Kevin Whitehead wrote, "She never sounds better than in ballads, and on Sixteen Sunsets she plays more than a dozen, including a few associated with Billie Holiday." Bill Kohlhaase writing for The Santa Fe New Mexican observed, "Sixteen Sunsets is a showcase for soprano saxophonist Jane Ira Bloom's rich tone and fluid expression. The disc's well-engineered sound and the smart program—six originals from Bloom and eight ballads—also showcase her thoughtful, deliberate way with melody. There's no rushing here. Bloom seems to dwell on each note, no matter the phrase it appears in, delivering each with a tonal fullness that resonates with warmth and color."

Track listing

Personnel
Jane Ira Bloom – soprano saxophone
Dominic Fallacaro – piano
Cameron Brown – bass
Matt Wilson – drums

References

External links

Jane Ira Bloom albums
2013 albums